Amanda Coetzer and Alexandra Fusai were the defending champions but did not compete that year.

Virginia Ruano Pascual and Paola Suárez won in the final 4–6, 6–1, 6–1 against Cătălina Cristea and Laura Montalvo.

Seeds
Champion seeds are indicated in bold text while text in italics indicates the round in which those seeds were eliminated.

 Virginia Ruano Pascual /  Paola Suárez (champions)
 Cătălina Cristea /  Laura Montalvo (final)
 Svetlana Krivencheva /  Eva Melicharová (quarterfinals)
 Laura Golarsa /  Liezel Horn (semifinals)

Draw

External links
 1998 Budapest Lotto Open Doubles Draw

Budapest Grand Prix
1998 WTA Tour